"Super recogniser" is a term coined in 2009 by Harvard and University College London researchers for people with significantly better-than-average face recognition ability. Super recognisers are able to memorise and recall thousands of faces, often having seen them only once.

Skill
It is the extreme opposite of prosopagnosia. It is estimated that 1 to 2% of the population are super recognisers who can remember 80% of faces they have seen compared to 20% of the general population, but these figures are disputed. Super recognizers can match faces better than computer recognition systems in some circumstances. The science behind this is poorly understood but may be related to the fusiform face area part of the brain.

Practical applications
The skill is recognised and employed among the British intelligence community.

In May 2015, the London Metropolitan Police officially formed a team made up of people with this heightened capability for recognising people and put them to work identifying individuals whose faces are captured on CCTV. Scotland Yard has a squad of over 200 super recognisers. In August 2018, it was reported that the Metropolitan Police had used two super recognisers to identify the suspects of the attack on Sergei and Yulia Skripal, after trawling through up to 5,000 hours of CCTV footage from Salisbury and numerous airports across the country.

German police forces have made increasing use of super recognisers for suspect identification, such as in the wake of the 2020 Stuttgart riot.

Glasgow Face Matching Test
Super recognisers performed well in the Glasgow Face Matching Test in comparison with a control group.

References

Further reading

External links
 
 
 
 
Greenwich University - Could You be A Super Recognizer

Face perception
Giftedness
Video surveillance
Surveillance